Tam Đường is a township and capital of Tam Đường District, Lai Châu Province, Vietnam. The province speaks Vietnamese.

References

Populated places in Lai Châu province
District capitals in Vietnam
Townships in Vietnam